Rwanda has been the center of much international attention since the war and genocide of 1994.

International memberships
Rwanda is a member of the United Nations, African Union, Commonwealth of Nations since November 2009; and the East African Community, and a member of the Port Management Association of Eastern and Southern Africa (PMAESA).

It presided over the Security Council during part of 1995 and again in 2013–2014. The UN assistance mission in Rwanda, a UN Chapter 6 peace-keeping operation, involved personnel from more than a dozen countries. Most of the UN development and humanitarian agencies have had a large presence in Rwanda.

During the height of the Rwandan Civil War, a three-month period in 1994, the UN removed most of its peacekeepers, and virtually all other formal foreign support fled as well. While formal foreign assistance evaporated at the height of the emergency, more than 200 non-governmental organizations were carrying out humanitarian operations. The only nation to directly involve itself at that point was France. Most historians agree with RPF's assertions that the 1994 genocide was a deliberate, methodical Hutu campaign to completely exterminate the Tutsis, and that plans for the genocide were well known in advance by European, American, and UN officials.

Accepting refugees
Rwanda has been accepting tens of thousands of refugees from neighboring African countries like Burundi, the Democratic Republic of Congo, Eritrea, Somalia and South Sudan. It has also accepted hundreds of African refugees from Israel and Afghan schoolgirls.

As of 2015, Rwanda hosted 75,000 Burundian refugees according to UNHCR. When credible reports surfaced that Rwanda recruited and trained Burundi refugees including children to remove Burundian President Nkurunziza, Rwanda announced to relocate Burundian refugees to third countries. 

Since September 2019, Rwanda has also taken in Libyan refugees and asylum-seekers, operating a refugee center at Gashora, Rwanda, which houses up to 700 refugees from eight African countries (Eritrea, Sudan, South Sudan, Somalia, Ethiopia, Nigeria, Chad and Cameroon) and is financed by UNHCR until 31 December 2023.

In 2021 Denmark signed a deal to establish an asylum center in Kigali, and since April 2022, the UK has sought to shift its asylum responsibilities, considering Rwanda a safe third country by offering 120 million pounds in economic development programs in return for accepting refugees.

Bilateral relations
Several west European and African nations, Canada, People's Republic of China, Egypt, Libya, Russia, the Holy See, and the European Union maintain diplomatic missions in Kigali.

See also

 List of diplomatic missions in Rwanda
 List of diplomatic missions of Rwanda

References